Nehru Stadium or Dronacharya Stadium is a cricket stadium in Gurgaon, India. Nehru Stadium which is designed for football and athletics. The stadium is home ground for Haryana cricket team. Presently it is named after first Prime Minister of India Jawaharlal Nehru. Stadium has hosted an international match between Ireland women's cricket team  and Pakistan women's national cricket team in 1997 Women's Cricket World Cup where Ireland women's cricket team won by 182 runs.

Women's One Day International cricket

The stadium has hosted following Women's ODI matches till date.

References

External links
 Cricinfo Website - Ground Page
 cricketarchive Website - Ground Page
 Gurgaon
 wikimapia

Sport in Gurgaon
Sports venues in Haryana
Cricket grounds in Haryana
Defunct cricket grounds in India
Football venues in Haryana
Buildings and structures in Gurgaon
1987 establishments in Haryana
Sports venues completed in 1987
20th-century architecture in India